Noah Katterbach (born 13 April 2001) is a German professional footballer who plays as a left-back for 2. Bundesliga club Hamburger SV, on loan from 1. FC Köln. One of Germany's most promising prospects, he has won the prestigious Fritz Walter Medal in Gold in two consecutive year groups (under-17 and under-19).

Club career
Katterbach spent the majority of his youth career at 1. FC Köln, starting at the under-8 level. In 2018, he was awarded the Fritz Walter Medal in Gold, honouring the best German player in the under-17 age group.

On 5 October 2019, he made his professional debut for the club in a 1–1 draw against Schalke, making him the youngest player to appear in the Bundesliga that year. During the 2019–20 season, Katterbach established himself in the club's first team squad and made 18 league appearances. In May 2020, it was announced that he had signed a contract extension keeping him at Köln until 2024.

On 19 August 2020, Katterbach was awarded the Fritz Walter Medal in Gold for the second time, this time honouring him as the best German player in the under-19 age group. On 18 January 2022, Köln announced on their website that they had transferred Katterbach to the Swiss Super League club FC Basel.

On the same day, Basel announced in a press-release that Katterbach had signed a one calendar year contract with them, including the option of a definitive transfer. On 30 January, after playing in three test games, Katterbach made his domestic league debut in an away game at Swissporarena as Basel played against Luzern. He was shown a yellow card in the 52nd minute, but also gave the final pass in the 85th minute as Darian Males scored the team's second goal, as FCB achieved a 3–0 victory. He scored his first goal for the club in the home game in the St. Jakob-Park on 19 February 2022. It was the last goal of the game as Basel won 3–0 against Lausanne-Sport.

On 17 January 2023, Hamburger SV announced on the club's website that they had signed Katterbach on a loan contract until the end of the 2022–23 season.

International career
Katterbach has represented Germany at several youth levels, beginning with the U 16 team in 2017. Most recently, he played for his country's U 20 squad.

Career statistics

Honours
Individual
Fritz Walter Medal U17 Gold: 2018
Fritz Walter Medal U19 Gold: 2020

References

2001 births
Living people
Footballers from Cologne
German footballers
Association football fullbacks
Germany under-21 international footballers
Germany youth international footballers
Bundesliga players
1. FC Köln players
FC Basel players
Swiss Super League players
German expatriate sportspeople in Switzerland
German expatriate footballers
Expatriate footballers in Switzerland
Hamburger SV players
2. Bundesliga players